Esteban Manuel Gutiérrez Gutiérrez (born 5 August 1991) is a Mexican racing driver currently competing in the IMSA WeatherTech SportsCar Championship for CrowdStrike Racing by APR. He is also a development driver for Mercedes-AMG Petronas F1 Team.

Previously from 2013 to 2014, Gutiérrez drove for the Sauber Formula One team but lost his drive at the end of the 2014 season. He then signed with Ferrari as their test and reserve driver for 2015. Gutiérrez drove for the Haas F1 Team for the 2016 Formula One season.

In 2008, Gutiérrez won the Formula BMW Europe championship title,becoming the youngest Mexican driver to win an International Championship at 17 years old. He also won the inaugural GP3 season in 2010. With the Lotus GP team in 2012, he became the first GP3 graduate to finish in the top three of the GP2 parent series.

Gutiérrez has also raced in Formula E and the IndyCar Series. His younger brother José Gutiérrez is also a racing driver.

Personal life

Gutiérrez was born in Monterrey, Nuevo León, the second of four brothers and one sister. He currently lives in London.

Early career

Karting
Gutiérrez started his career in 2004 in the Mexican Rotax Max Challenge when he raced in the last 3 events of the season. In 2005, he again competed in the Mexican Rotax Max Challenge, and also raced in the Grand Nationals in South Bend, Indiana, where he finished third, which earned him a place at the World Finals in Malaysia, where he finished 22nd due to mechanical problems.

In 2006, Esteban won all 5 races in the Camkart Challenge Mexico, and again he raced in the Mexican Rotax Max Challenge. He also finished 4th in the Mexican Grand Nationals in Zacatecas, Mexico.

Formula BMW Series

2007–2008
In 2007, Gutiérrez made the step up into the single-seater ranks, competing in the Formula BMW USA series. He finished second overall in the championship, with 4 wins, 8 podiums, 9 pole positions and 3 fastest laps, earning him Rookie of the Year honours. Despite finishing second, Gutiérrez finished some 87 points behind runaway champion Daniel Morad. Gutiérrez raced at the Formula BMW World Final in 2007, eventually finishing last of the classified finishers in 25th.

Gutiérrez moved across to Europe to compete in the 2008 Formula BMW Europe championship, which was the championship's maiden season after the merging of the British and German series. He won the championship by 26 points from his closest rival Marco Wittmann, taking 7 wins, 6 of which consecutively, and appearing on the podium another 5 times. Out of the seasons 16 races, he only finished outside the points twice in the whole season and retired once overall, giving him a final score of 353 points.

In his final FBMW race, Gutiérrez qualified on pole and finished third at the 2008 World Final in Mexico City, beaten only by the current FBMW Americas champion at the time Alexander Rossi and Michael Christensen.

Formula 3 Euro Series
For 2009, Gutiérrez moved up to the Formula 3 Euro Series with a seat at reigning champions ART Grand Prix alongside Jules Bianchi, Valtteri Bottas and Adrien Tambay. He finished ninth overall in the championship, taking two podiums at the Nürburgring and Dijon Prenois.

He ended the season with 26 points altogether. He also competed in two rounds of the British Formula 3 season, taking a podium and fastest lap at the Algarve International Circuit, racing against eventual champion Daniel Ricciardo.

GP3 Series
2010 saw Gutiérrez move to the GP3 Series, competing for ART Grand Prix. He joined Pedro Nunes and Alexander Rossi at the team. Gutiérrez won the inaugural season with two races to spare by taking pole position, and the resultant two bonus points that came with it, for the final race weekend in Monza. Gutiérrez dominated the whole season as he scored 10 times out of the 16 races, with 8 podium finishes and 5 wins.

GP2 Series

2009

Gutiérrez was invited to the GP2 test in Jerez, Spain for the 2009 season on 6 October for ART Grand Prix, his first time in a GP2 car. During the day he improved on his times finishing with a time just over half a second slower than the fastest time set by Jules Bianchi, who was also driving for ART. He was also recognised as the third fastest rookie of the day. Gutiérrez again participated in another test session for GP2 at the end of year test in Paul Ricard, France for Telmex Arden International.

2010
At the end of 2010, after winning the Inaugural GP3 season with ART, the GP2 sister team signed him for a full drive for the 2011 season.

2011
ART Grand Prix was renamed Lotus ART for the 2011. Gutierrez was paired with Jules Bianchi for both the GP2 series and GP2 Asia series. He finished eleventh in the 2011 GP2 Asia series after taking a single 4th-place finish at the Imola sprint race.

In the main series, he finished 13th in the drivers' championship after he scored his first points with a 7th-place finish in the Valencia feature race. He followed this up with his first GP2 series victory at the sprint race as well as setting his first fastest lap scoring twice more that season including a 2nd-place finish in the sprint race at Hungary.

2012 

He remained with Lotus ART for the 2012 season, with the team being renamed Lotus GP after the increased sponsorship from Lotus, and was partnered with James Calado.His third place in the championship marked him the first GP3 graduate to finish in the top 3 of the GP2 series, with 176 points, 3 wins, 4 other separate podiums and 5 fastest laps, equalling Valsecchi's total for the year for most fastest laps of the season.

Formula One
Gutiérrez first tested a BMW Sauber Formula One car in December 2009 as part of his prize for winning the Formula BMW Europe championship. Later in the season, he was officially named as the team's test and reserve driver on 10 September. On 16 November 2010 he took part in the young drivers test in Abu Dhabi setting the 4th fastest time of the day, just over six-tenths of a second off the qualifying time set by Kamui Kobayashi.

He ultimately recorded the 20th fastest time in the session, before Pérez was able to return to the car for the second session.

Sauber (2013–2014)

In 2013 Gutiérrez was promoted to the race team with Sauber, alongside Nico Hülkenberg who joined from Force India. After a solid drive he eventually finished the race thirteenth, the best position of all of the 2013 rookies. In Malaysia, Gutiérrez made it through into Q2 and qualified 14th, and finished in twelfth, after he was forced to pit with five laps remaining.

Spain saw Gutiérrez achieve his first fastest lap of the race, putting him second in the record books for 'Youngest Driver to Set a Fastest Lap' after Nico Rosberg.

Ferrari (2015)
On December 15, 2014, Gutiérrez was announced as Scuderia Ferrari test and reserve driver for the 2015 Formula One season, in place of the late Jules Bianchi.

Haas F1 (2016)

Gutiérrez finished 14th at the Chinese Grand Prix, passing ex-teammate Nico Hülkenberg in the closing laps. Gutiérrez finished 11th at the Monaco Grand Prix, Austrian Grand Prix, German Grand Prix, Singapore Grand Prix and 12th at the Abu Dhabi Grand Prix.

On 11 November 2016, Gutiérrez confirmed via social media he would be leaving Haas F1 Team.

Reserve and development driver for Mercedes (2018–present)
On 5 July 2018, Gutiérrez joined Mercedes AMG as a simulator driver from the beginning of the season. He has since been named as a reserve driver in Formula 1 and Formula E. Gutierrez frequently visits the team's factory to carry out simulator work in preparation for F1 races and development of its car, supporting race drivers Lewis Hamilton and George Russell.

In 2020, with the postponement and cancellation of races due to the COVID-19 pandemic, Gutierrez represented Mercedes in the virtual world taking part in several high-profile esports events. It was discovered in August 2020 that Gutiérrez had stopped being eligible for a super licence at the start of the year after the introduction of new requirements to maintain them after more than three years, which had been overlooked by Mercedes and made him ineligible to be a reserve driver in Formula One. He continues to work for Mercedes in 2021 as a brand and business ambassador.

Formula E
On 10 January 2017, Gutiérrez announced that he would be joining Formula E, for selected races during the 2016–17 season. On 9 March 2017, it was announced Gutiérrez would replace Ma Qing Hua at Techeetah, from the fourth round onwards. He competed at the Mexico City, Monaco and Paris ePrix and finished within the top 10 twice. He achieved a season finish of 22nd with the five points he gained from his three races.

IndyCar
On 1 June 2017, it was announced that Gutiérrez would be joining the IndyCar Series for the Chevrolet Detroit Grand Prix Presented by Lear Corporation, standing in for the injured Sébastien Bourdais at Dale Coyne Racing. Gutiérrez participated in seven events.

Esports 
During the 2020 COVID-19 pandemic and subsequent lockdown, relatively new to esports, Gutiérrez began participating in a variety of esports events, taking multiple wins and podium finishes.

He competed in the F1 Esports Virtual Grand Prix Series and The Race All Stars, where he was fighting for the title until a technical glitch took him out of contention in the final round. Since the culmination of these events, Gutierrez has continued streaming on his dedicated channel on Twitch and Discord.

Racing record

Career summary

† As Gutiérrez was a guest driver, he was ineligible for points.
* Season still in progress.

Complete Formula 3 Euro Series results
(key) (Races in bold indicate pole position; races in italics indicate fastest lap)

† As Gutiérrez was a guest driver, he was ineligible for points.

Complete GP3 Series results
(key) (Races in bold indicate pole position; races in italics indicate fastest lap)

Complete GP2 Series results
(key) (Races in bold indicate pole position; races in italics indicate fastest lap)

† Gutiérrez did not finish the race, but was classified as he had completed over 90% of the race distance.

Complete GP2 Asia Series results
(key) (Races in bold indicate pole position; races in italics indicate fastest lap)

Complete GP2 Final results
(key) (Races in bold indicate pole position) (Races in italics indicate fastest lap)

Complete Formula One results
(key) (Races in bold indicate pole position; races in italics indicate fastest lap)

 Driver did not finish the Grand Prix, but was classified as he completed over 90% of the race distance.

Complete Formula E results
(key) (Races in bold indicate pole position; races in italics indicate fastest lap)

American open-wheel racing

IndyCar Series
(key) (Races in bold indicate pole position; races in italics indicate fastest lap)

Complete 24 Hours of Le Mans results

Complete FIA World Endurance Championship results
(Races in bold indicate pole position; results in italics indicate fastest lap)

Complete WeatherTech SportsCar Championship results
(key) (Races in bold indicate pole position; results in italics indicate fastest lap)

* Season still in progress.

Records
Seventh on the list of Youngest race leaders.
Fifth on the list of Youngest drivers to set a fastest lap.

References

External links
 
 

1991 births
Living people
Racing drivers from Nuevo León
Mexican Formula One drivers
Sportspeople from Monterrey
International Formula Master drivers
Formula BMW ADAC drivers
Formula BMW USA drivers
Formula BMW Europe drivers
British Formula Three Championship drivers
Formula 3 Euro Series drivers
24 Hours of Le Mans drivers
FIA World Endurance Championship drivers
Mexican GP3 Series drivers
GP2 Asia Series drivers
GP2 Series drivers
GP3 Series Champions
Sauber Formula One drivers
Haas Formula One drivers
Formula E drivers
IndyCar Series drivers
Josef Kaufmann Racing drivers
Trident Racing drivers
ART Grand Prix drivers
Techeetah drivers
Dale Coyne Racing drivers
Mexican racing drivers
German Formula Three Championship drivers
WeatherTech SportsCar Championship drivers